Nyamira County is a county in the former Nyanza Province of Kenya. It shares common boundaries with what was known as Nyamira District. The main cash crops grown are bananas and tea. The county has a population of 605,576 (2019 census). Its capital and largest town is Nyamira, with an urban population of around 41,668 (2009 census)

Nyamira County borders Kisii County to the East, Bomet and Kericho counties to the West, Homa Bay County to the North.

Physical and topical features 
Permanent rivers include Sondu, Eaka, Kijauri, Kemera, Charachani, Gucha (Kuja), Bisembe, Mogonga, Chirichiro, Ramacha and Egesagane and all of them drain water to lake victoria.

Climatic conditions 

Demographics 
The county has a population of 605,576 of which 290,907 are male, 314,656 are female, and 13 who are intersex. There are 150,669 households spawning an average size of 4.0 persons per household and a population density

Administrative and political units

Administrative units 
There are 5 sub counties, 4 electoral constituencies, 14 divisions, 46 locations and 114 sub-locations.

Sub counties 
 Nyamira North
 Nyamira South
 Borabu 
 Masaba North
 Manga

Electoral constituencies 
It has four constituencies and 20 county assembly wards,

West Mugirango constituency
Kitutu Masaba constituency
North Mugirango constituency
Borabu constituency
Source

Political leadership 
John Obiero Nyangarama was the Governor serving his last term in office after being elected twice 2013, 2017 and his deputy Amos Kimwomi Nyaribo is the current governor . Mogeni Erick Okong’o is the current Senator and the first senator in 2013 to 2017 was Kennedy Mong'are Okong'o. Jerusha Mongina Momanyi is the women representative and was elected in 2017 after winning against the Alice Chae who was the first women representative for the county.

For Nyamira County, the County Executive Committee comprises:-

Source

Health 
There is a total of 532 health facilities in the county with one county referral hospital. County has 610 health personnel of different cadre.

HIV prevalence is at 6.4% below the national 5.3% (Kenya HIV Estimates 2015).

Transport and communication 
The county is covered by 388 km of road network. of this 388 km is covered by earth surface, 208 km is murram surface.

There are five post offices and 15 sub post offices, 800 installed letter boxes, 700 rented letter boxes and 100 vacant letter boxes.

Trade and commerce 
There are 49 trading centres, 2049 registered businesses, 1641 licensed retail traders and 42 supermarkets.

County subdivisions

See also
Nsunera

External links
Kijamasters Map of the district

References

 
Counties of Kenya